Matías Nicolás Rodríguez (born 14 April 1986) is an Argentine naturalized Chilean former professional footballer who played as a right-back or right midfielder.

Club career
After years spending in Boca Juniors academy, he moved Ecuadorian Serie A club Aucas in mid-2006 (after fail joined on trial to Barcelona de Guayaquil), where scored three goals in 13 league matches, which his transfer fee was appraised in US$1 million, because their well performances. Following his success, he returned to Boca and had an horrible 2007, after have a seriously tibia and fibula injury. Finally, after one-and-half year without play, he joined Nacional Montevideo in June 2008.

In January 2010, following Gerardo Pelusso's departure (coach of Rodríguez at Nacional) to Universidad de Chile, he also joined Chilean club, where he won three league titles and the 2011 Copa Sudamericana title with Santiago-based club. However, all of these title was under manager Jorge Sampaoli, who replaced former coach Pelusso after bad results in 2010. Their most important goals with The Blues were in two derbies against Colo-Colo and in a 2010 Copa Libertadores game too with Flamengo, where he scored a last-minute equalizer goal that sealed a 2–2 away draw at Maracanã.

He also had serious possibilities of a move to Europe because his performances, being heavily linked with Portugal's Benfica in January 2012 after reach Copa Sudamericana title. However, on 29 January 2013, Rodríguez joined Italian Serie A club Sampdoria in a transfer fee a US$4.2 million (€3.28 million). He signed a -year contract. 

On 30 May 2014, Rodríguez was loaned from Serie A side Sampdoria to Grêmio until June 2015.

On 19 July 2015 Rodríguez was re-signed by Universidad de Chile.

On March 8, 2021, it was made official Rodríguez joined Argentine club Defensa y Justicia, arriving to Argentine Primera División by first time in his career.

In June 2022, he decided to leave the football activity after ending his contract with Defensa y Justicia, stating his desire of working as a sport manager.

International career
In June 2012, Rodríguez was selected by Alejandro Sabella for the Argentina national team as part of the squad for the matchday 5 of the 2014 FIFA World Cup qualification against Ecuador, as well as an International Friendly against Brazil in New Jersey. He was only a substitute in both matches. Later, Rodríguez was selected again in October 2012 for the matchday 10 against Chile, where he did not play either.

Personal life
In February 2022, he acquired the Chilean nationality by residence, keeping the Argentine nationality.

Career statistics

Club

Honours

Club
Nacional
Uruguayan Primera División: 2008–09

Universidad de Chile
Chilean Primera División: 2011 Apertura, 2011 Clausura, 2012 Apertura, 2016–17 Clausura
Copa Sudamericana: 2011
Copa Chile: 2015
Supercopa de Chile: 2015

Individual
Chilean Primera División XI: 2011
CONMEBOL XI: 2012

References

External links

Matías Rodríguez at Football-Lineups

Living people
1986 births
Argentine footballers
Argentine expatriate footballers
People from San Luis Province
Naturalized citizens of Chile
Chilean footballers 
Association football midfielders
Boca Juniors footballers
S.D. Aucas footballers
LASK players
Club Nacional de Football players
Universidad de Chile footballers
U.C. Sampdoria players
Grêmio Foot-Ball Porto Alegrense players
Defensa y Justicia footballers
Ecuadorian Serie A players
Austrian Football Bundesliga players
Uruguayan Primera División players
Chilean Primera División players
Serie A players
Campeonato Brasileiro Série A players
Argentine Primera División players
Argentine expatriate sportspeople in Ecuador
Argentine expatriate sportspeople in Austria
Argentine expatriate sportspeople in Uruguay
Argentine expatriate sportspeople in Chile
Argentine expatriate sportspeople in Italy
Argentine expatriate sportspeople in Brazil
Expatriate footballers in Ecuador
Expatriate footballers in Austria
Expatriate footballers in Uruguay
Expatriate footballers in Chile
Expatriate footballers in Italy
Expatriate footballers in Brazil